

Commissioned ships

Under Construction

Awarded/Authorized ships

Non-commissioned ships

Under Construction

Awarded/Authorized ships

See also 
 List of current ships of the United States Navy
 Future of the Royal Navy
 Future of the Royal Australian Navy
 Future of the Indian Navy
 Future of the Royal Netherlands Navy
 Future of the Russian Navy

Citations 

Ships of the United States Navy
Lists of ships of the United States
Military acquisition
Military planning